Zegveld is a village in the Dutch province of Utrecht. It is a part of the municipality of Woerden and lies about 5 km northwest of Woerden.

In 2001 the town of Zegveld had 1,576 inhabitants. The built-up area of the town was 0.21 km2, and contained 563 residences. The statistical district "Zegveld" has a population of around 2360. This covers the entire former municipality, including the hamlets of Lagebroek and Stichtse Meije.

White storks
The village has a center for white storks to nest, a unique place in the area.

History
The village used to be a separate municipality. In 1989, it merged with Woerden. Unlike Woerden, Zegveld was always a part of the province of Utrecht.

References

Populated places in Utrecht (province)
Woerden